The 2012–13 season was Alloa Athletic's first season back in the Scottish Second Division, having been promoted from the Scottish Third Division at the end of season 2011–12. Alloa also competed in the Challenge Cup, Scottish League Cup and the Scottish Cup.

Summary

Season
Alloa finished second in the Scottish Second Division, entering the play-offs defeating Dunfermline Athletic 3–1 on aggregate in the final and were promoted to the Scottish First Division. They reached the first round of the Challenge Cup, the first round of the League Cup and the third round of the Scottish Cup.

Results & fixtures

Pre season

Scottish Second Division

First Division play-offs

Scottish Challenge Cup

Scottish League Cup

Scottish Cup

Player statistics

Captains

Squad 
Last updated 16 May 2013 

|}
a.  Includes other competitive competitions, including the play-offs and the Challenge Cup.

Disciplinary record
Includes all competitive matches.
Last updated 19 May 2013

Team statistics

League table

Division summary

Transfers

Players in

Players out

References

Alloa Athletic F.C. seasons
Alloa Athletic